Lightning Lake is a lake located in E. C. Manning Provincial Park, British Columbia, Canada. The lake is freshwater and is located within the Similkameen-Okanagan forest district. The lake is unusual as it drains in two directions, into Flash Lake in the south and the Similkameen River to the north. The current lake is not a naturally occurring lake, as at the north end, near the day-use area, there is an earthen dam. The lake is very shallow and near the end of the summer season, the narrows under the Rainbow Bridge are either very shallow or dry.

Recreation
Lightning Lake is the mains summer tourism feature within Manning Park. Both canoes and rowboats are available for rental from the day-use area. The lake provides a paved boat launch; however, powercraft and jet-skis are prohibited on the lake. Parking at the lake free for all vehicles, and overnight parking is permitted as there are back-country campgrounds located at multiple locations along the Lightning Lakes chain. Fishing is permitted within the park.

Hiking

The lake is skirted by a 9 km level-grade hiking-only trail, which can be halved by taking the Rainbow Bridge at the narrows of the lake. The day-use parking area serves also as a parking area for the Windy Joe, Mount Frosty, and Lightning Lakes Chain hike.

Camping
There are two drive-in camping areas, maintained by Manning Park Resort for BC Parks, on Lightning Lake. The first is Lone Duck Group Camp, which is open year-round, and the Lightning Lake Campground, which is a trailer-camping facility with flush toilets. There are no hike-in campgrounds on Lightning Lake due to its proximity to roads.

Lightning Lakes Chain
Lightning Lake is the first of the four lakes on the Lightning Lakes chain, all of which are located within E. C. Manning Provincial Park. The entire chain is accessible by maintained hiking trails and there are campgrounds on the other lakes.
Lightning Lake
Flash Lake
Strike Lake
Thunder Lake

References

External links
 Information about Lightning Lake on SharpHooks.com
 Information on summer lake activities on the Manning Park Resort website

Lakes of British Columbia
Yale Division Yale Land District